Carros is a commune in the Alpes-Maritimes department in southeastern France. Carros is one of sixteen villages grouped together by the Métropole Nice Côte d'Azur tourist department as the Route des Villages Perchés (Route of Perched Villages). The others are: Aspremont, Castagniers, Coaraze, Colomars, Duranus, Èze, Falicon, La Gaude, Lantosque, Levens, La Roquette-sur-Var, Saint-Blaise, Saint-Jeannet, Tourrette-Levens and Utelle.

Population
The inhabitants are called Carrossois.

See also
Communes of the Alpes-Maritimes department

References

Communes of Alpes-Maritimes